A Touch of Larceny is a 1959 black-and-white comedy film produced by Ivan Foxwell, directed by Guy Hamilton, and starring James Mason, George Sanders and Vera Miles. The film co-stars Harry Andrews, Rachel Gurney and John Le Mesurier, and is based on the 1956 novel The Megstone Plot by Paul Winterton, written under the pseudonym Andrew Garve.

A Touch of Larceny was nominated for the BAFTA award for Best British Screenplay, but lost to The Angry Silence.

Plot
A British World War II naval war hero, Commander Max "Rammer" Easton now holds a mid-level staff position at the British Admiralty, where he is underemployed, and he spends most of his free time playing squash and pursuing women.

While at his private club, he meets Sir Charles Holland and later Holland's American companion, Virginia Killain. As soon as Holland goes away for a few days, Max makes a play for Virginia, but she is engaged to be married to Holland and is offended by Max describing him as "dull" and tells Max she considers him to be a rake. Undaunted, he persists until she agrees to have lunch with him.

They later go sailing on Easton's sailboat. Observing that Virginia is impressed by Holland's old school wealth, Max claims that it is easy to acquire money, which she challenges, so on the spot he comes up with an unscrupulous scheme to demonstrate to her just how easy it is. He relates how, after suddenly disappearing under suspicious circumstances, he would leave behind clues and red herrings leading others to jump to the conclusion that he is a traitor, having stolen top secret British Admiralty documents from his division, then defected to the Soviet Union. The scandal would leak and spread through the British press like wildfire. Upon his sudden and surprising return, he would sue the press for libel, raking in thousands of pounds in out-of-court settlements.

When she rejects his marriage proposal and says she doesn't want to see him again, Max decides to implement his scheme, sailing away to an out-of-the-way rocky island off the Scottish coast, where he sinks his boat and makes a camp. In due course, he is publicly branded a traitor by the press, all according to his plan. Virginia is at first amused by all this, but then becomes annoyed when she realizes he has actually gone through with it. When she tells Sir Charles, he is outraged and says something must be done. Max's elaborate plan backfires, however, when just as he is about to raise the alarm and get rescued, things go awry and he becomes marooned for real.

After eventually being rescued, Max is astonished to learn that he was rescued after a "message in a bottle" was found on a beach. Sir Charles reveals to authorities everything that Virginia told him about Max's hoax. When confronted, Max's quick thinking frees him from suspicion of any wrong-doing. He then visits Virginia to tell her that, instead of suing the press, he now plans on selling "the true story" of his survival and rescue to the very same press who libelled him. When Sir Charles arrives and berates Max, it becomes clear to Charles that he has lost Virginia and he leaves, after which she succumbs and agrees to marry Max.

Cast
 James Mason as Commander Max Easton
 George Sanders as Sir Charles Holland
 Vera Miles as Virginia Killain
 Oliver Johnston as Minister
 Robert Flemyng as Commander John Larkin
 William Kendall as Tom
 Duncan Lamont as Gregson
 Harry Andrews as Captain Graham
 Peter Barkworth as Sub-lieutenant Brown
 Rachel Gurney as Clara Holland
 Martin Stephens as John Holland
 Waveney Lee as Marcia Holland
 Charles Carson as Robert Holland
 Junia Crawford - Susan
 Henry B. Longhurst as Club Member

Critical reaction

In its March 17, 1960 review by A.H. Weiler, The New York Times observed about the film: "Mr. MacDougall and his collaborators have devised civilized and, on occasion, mildly funny lines for their cast to speak. The cast, including Harry Andrews, as a strictly Navy captain, and Robert Flemyng, John Le Mesurier and Peter Barkworth, as other officers, pitches in to the proceedings in polished, casual style. These actors, as well as the principals [James Mason, George Sanders, and Vera Miles] make this "Touch of Larceny" droll, if not devastating".

Box Office
Kine Weekly called it a "money maker" at the British box office in 1960.

See also
1959 in film

References

External links

 

1959 films
1959 comedy films
British comedy films
Films directed by Guy Hamilton
Paramount Pictures films
Films shot at MGM-British Studios
1950s English-language films
1950s British films